Frank Edward Peretti (born January 13, 1951) is a New York Times best-selling author of Christian fiction, whose novels primarily focus on the supernatural. , his works have sold over 15 million copies worldwide. He has been described by the New York Times as creating the Christian thriller genre. Peretti is best known for his novels This Present Darkness (1986) and Piercing the Darkness (1989). Peretti has held ministry credentials with the Assemblies of God, and formerly played the banjo in a bluegrass band called Northern Cross. He now lives in Coeur d'Alene, Idaho with his wife, Barbara.

Biography
Frank E. Peretti was born in Lethbridge in southern Alberta, Canada, but raised in Seattle, Washington for most of his life. Peretti was a natural storyteller who, as a child in Seattle, regularly told stories to neighborhood children. After graduating from high school, he began playing banjo with a local bluegrass group. He married his wife, Barbara, in 1972. Later, he studied English, screen writing and film at UCLA, and then assisted his father in pastoring a small Assembly of God church. In 1983, he gave up his pastoring position and began taking construction jobs to make ends meet.

Writing

Early work
While working at a ski factory, Peretti wrote and published a well-received adventure story for children, The Door in the Dragon's Throat (1985). A year later, he published This Present Darkness (1986), his most famous and popular novel to date. Although This Present Darkness was not an immediate success, sales improved with word of mouth, particularly after singer Amy Grant promoted the book. The book remained on the Christian Booksellers Association's top ten best-sellers list for over 150 consecutive weeks, and has as of 2013 sold over 2.7 million copies worldwide.

Peretti followed This Present Darkness with a sequel Piercing the Darkness (1989), another tremendous success. Combined, This Present Darkness and Piercing the Darkness have sold 3.5 million copies.

Peretti also took the characters from his first work The Door in the Dragon's Throat and used them to write The Cooper Kids Adventure Series, releasing seven more titles that contained the same Indiana Jones-style adventures similar to The Door in the Dragon's Throat.

Throughout the 1990s, Peretti continued to write full-time, releasing Prophet (1992), The Oath (1995), and The Visitation (1999). The Oath, generally regarded as one of Peretti's greater works, has sold more than one million copies, and received the ECPA Gold Medallion Book Award for Best Fiction in 1996. The Visitation landed at #19 on the New York Times Bestseller list and was adapted into a film in 2006.

Later years
The turn of the millennium saw Peretti's departure from writing his popular novels. He wrote a 2000 memoir, The Wounded Spirit, which covered his struggles as a child with a facial tumor known as cystic hygroma, which caused him to be mocked by other children and retreat to solitude, until it was eventually treated with multiple surgeries. He dwelled on the subject of bullying in his non-fiction titles No More Victims (2001) and No More Bullies (2003).

In 2001, Peretti released Hangman's Curse, the first book in the Veritas Project series for teens. The book was an instant hit among both teens and adults, and was made into a low-budget 2003 film of the same name. The second book in the series, Nightmare Academy, was published in 2002 with equal success. The two books together sold more than 500,000 copies, according to Thomas Nelson Publishers. Peretti has mentioned that there may be more possible entries in the Veritas Project series.

Peretti's first full-length novel after 2000 was the 2005 thriller Monster, which played with the Bigfoot legend and explored issues surrounding the "survival of the fittest" and creationist-based objections to evolution. Monster hit the New York Times Bestseller list at #34 on its first week and rose to #29 on its second week.

In April 2006, Peretti and fellow supernatural author Ted Dekker co-authored the novel House. It received mixed reviews from Peretti and Dekker fans, but was popular enough to be adapted as the 2008 film House, starring Michael Madsen.

In April 2010, it was announced that Peretti had signed with Howard Books (a division of Simon & Schuster) for a new novel. The novel, Illusion, was published in March 2012.

Influence and themes 
Peretti's work, with its themes of spiritual warfare, has been described belonging to "an older tradition of believ­ers, including C. S. Lewis, John Bunyan, and John Milton (and before them, medieval and ancient apocalyptic writers), who depicted angels and humans at war."

A recurring theme in his writings – and in interviews – is the concept of a peaceful, simple life. Characters are described as living on quaint farms, living a simple, rural life, or living in small, community-focused towns. In one interview, Peretti noted that he believes Christians ought to "live a quiet life, mind our own business, work with our own hands, and walk properly toward those outside."

Filmography
Tilly, a novella which started out as an audio drama produced by Focus on the Family and aired on August 10, 1987, was adapted into a forty-minute film by anti-abortion group Love Life America in 2002 and shown on both PAX TV and briefly on the EWTN show Defending Life before being released on DVD. It was directed by Stephen Vidano and produced by IMS Productions.

In 2004 Hangman's Curse was made into a film, in which Peretti himself had a small role as an eccentric professor, Dr. Algernon Wheeling. It had a limited release in theaters but appears to have been successful enough to encourage film producers to continue developing Peretti's books into films.

The Visitation was also made into a film by Twentieth Century Fox in 2006.

House was released in select theaters on November 7, 2008.

In addition to his appearance in Hangman's Curse, Peretti has had a voice role in Flo, the Lying Fly, the second computer animated entry in the Hermie and Friends series for children. He has also made a number of videos (and associated audio tapes and books) in which he takes on the persona of Mr. Henry, a slightly eccentric inventor and Bible teacher. While the format is unusual, it contains none of the theology of his adults' books.

Critical reviews
Peretti has been hailed as "America's hottest Christian novelist" and a "sanctified Stephen King". He has received generally positive praise from many Christian book reviews, his books being heralded as telling entertaining stories with complex interwoven plots.

Theological criticisms
Peretti's fictional portrayal of spiritual warfare reflects in part his background in the Assemblies of God and the contemporary focus of Pentecostal writings on the demonic. His concept of Territorial Spirits reigning over cities or "spiritual mapping" is paralleled in the Neo-charismatic world, including in non-fiction works in theology and missions by Pentecostal writers such as C. Peter Wagner, Larry Lea, Ed Silvoso and Ed Murphy.

His books have been considered to reflect the New Christian Right. As his novels have been widely sold and read throughout Evangelical, Charismatic and Pentecostal churches, Peretti's fiction has excited the imaginations of clergy and laity alike on the subject of spiritual warfare. Michael Maudlin of Christianity Today reports hearing that some readers have been so enthused they have declared that This Present Darkness is the best book ever written after the Bible. He has also described its theology as "closer to primitive dualism than traditional Christian theism."

Some critical reservations have been expressed by a number of Evangelical and Pentecostal writers that many readers are using Peretti's novels as manuals on prayer, exorcism, spiritual warfare and as guidebooks about dangers of the New Age movement. For example, Kim Riddlebarger expresses alarm that many readers have "redefined their entire worldview based upon a novel" and insists that the Bible does not call upon Christians to "engage in spiritual warfare as a combat between angels and demons". His 1992 novel Prophet included a disclaimer stating "This novel is a creative work of fiction imparting spiritual truth in a symbolic manner, and not an emphatic statement of religious doctrine."

Irving Hexham rejects Peretti's depiction of the New Age as confirming a negative stereotype. Hexham observes that Peretti's novels reflect the anxieties that many fundamentalist and evangelical Christians have about secular society, the mass media, the social sciences and tertiary education. He is also disturbed "to see the way Frank Peretti has become a popular and oft-quoted authority on the New Age" because "his actual qualifications in religious matters are minimal". Andrew Connolly notes that "these enemies, united under a New Age banner, are motivated not simply by an alternative religious ideology, but by demons" in Peretti's work.

Impact 
In addition to creating the Christian thriller genre, Peretti's work has had an impact on Christian literature and culture. Christianity Today and the New York Times have stated his work has led the way for later Christian fiction such as the Left Behind series, which authors Tim LaHaye and Jerry B. Jenkins have acknowledged, as well as for fiction by Pat Robertson and Chuck Colson.

Connolly argues Peretti's writing opened the door for other evangelical fiction that is gendered as masculine. Peretti has stated that "Christian fiction used to be very nonconfrontative – you know, the young woman struggling against the rigors of prairie life meets a fine young Christian minister."

The editor-in-chief of the publisher Crossway Books has described Peretti's thrillers as being written for the Moral Majority, stating, "there are 35 or 40 million people in this country who are really upset with the way things are. For once, their side is not beaten down. They win." While his thrillers deal with war between angels and demons, the Los Angeles Times notes they also "[explore] other issues such as curricula used in public schools and attempts by a thinly disguised version of the American Civil Liberties Union to shut down a Christian school by charging that corporal punishment constitutes child abuse." Historian Crawford Gribben argues Peretti's work "certainly set the terms for the re-energizing and even the remilitarization, of evangelicalism"; others have noted his writings encourage readers to take political action.

QAnon, with its messianic spiritual warfare overtones, has been connected to "the same culture previously captivated and emboldened" by Peretti's novels such as the Darkness series.

Peretti's books have been translated to dozens of languages, among them Chinese, Croatian, French, German, Hungarian, Norwegian, Polish, Russian and Swedish.

Bibliography

Novels
 This Present Darkness (1986)
 Piercing the Darkness (1989)
 Prophet (1992)
 The Oath (1995)
 The Visitation (1999)
 Monster (2005)
 House (2006; with Ted Dekker)
 Illusion (2012)

The Veritas Project series
 Hangman's Curse (2001)
 Nightmare Academy (2002)

The Harbingers series
 Invitation: Cycle One (2017)
 The Assault: Cycle Two (2017)
 Probing: Cycle Three (2017)

The Cooper Kids adventure series
 The Door in the Dragon's Throat (1985)
 Escape from the Island of Aquarius (1986)
 The Tombs of Anak (1987)
 Trapped at the Bottom of the Sea (1988)
 The Secret of the Desert Stone (1995)
 The Deadly Curse of Toco-rey (1996)
 The Legend of Annie Murphy (1996)
 Flying Blind (1997) (also known as Mayday at Two Thousand Five Hundred Feet)

Non-fiction
 The Wounded Spirit (2000)
 No More Victims (2000)
 No More Bullies (2003)

Other titles
 Tilly (1988)
 All Is Well: The Miracle of Christmas in July (2003)

References

External links
 
 

1951 births
Living people
20th-century American novelists
21st-century American novelists
20th-century American male writers
21st-century American male writers
American Christian writers
American male novelists
Canadian emigrants to the United States
Christian novelists
Novelists from Washington (state)
UCLA Film School alumni
University of California, Los Angeles alumni
Writers from Seattle
20th-century American non-fiction writers
21st-century American non-fiction writers
American male non-fiction writers